Atra Gilatala Union  is a Union Council of Phultala Upazila .

Location and Area 
Atra Gilatla Union is located in Phultala Upazila of Khulna District. It is located south of Phultala upazila. Atra Gilatala Union is bounded by Damodar UP on the North, Bhairav River on the East, Ward No. 1 of Khulna City Corporation and Yogipol Union Parishad on the South and Bill Dakatiya on the West. The area of ​​this union is 19.54 square kilometers. The total land area is 4830.48 hectares.

Chairman And UP Secretary

Population And Voter 
According to the 2010 voter list (allegedly double that number now):

Village 
There are total eight villages in Atra Atra Gilatala Union, the villages are very beautiful and picturesque.

Market 
Total number of market: 6

Canals and Rivers 
Bhairav River flows in Atra Atra Gilatala Union. Even though it is only one river, it is of great benefit to the people here, the fishermen community earn their livelihood by catching fish in the river. Boats ply the river and launch, steamers and cargo ships ply for communication. Apart from this, there are many canals in various villages of the Union which benefit the people of the area in various ways. People catch fish in canals, drain water from here and irrigate land. And it is very useful for harvesting. All the canals in this union are:-

 Nona Canal
 Balia Canal
 Soyaler Canal

Tourist Spot 
Atra Gilatala Union has many scenic spots. Among which Khulna's largest Jahanabad Cantonment Banovilas Zoo, largest Jahanabad Cantonment Shishu Park is one of them, Police Firing Range, BNCC Camp. There is also Bhairav River, Bypass Road and Bill-Dakatiya.

Educational Institutions

College 

 Cantonment Public College
 Khanjahan Ali Adarsh College
 Metro Technical and BM College

High School 

 Gilatala Secondary School
 Cantonment Public Secondary School 
 Atra Srinath Secondary School
 Shiromani Secondary School 
 Mashiali Secondary School
 Alim Eastern Secondary School
 Atara Secondary Girls School

Madrasa 

 Mashiali Darul Uloom Dakhil Madrasa
 Shiromani Alim Madrasa
 Gilatala Ahmadia Dakhil Madrasa
 Shiromani Hafizia Madrasa
 Atra Shamsul Uloom Qaumi Madrasa
 Gilatala Sheikhpara Ba. Fa.  Hafizia Madrasa
 Gilatala Mohammadia Hafizia Madrasa

Hospital 

 Union Health and Family Welfare Center
 BNSB Eye Hospital
 Linda Clinic

References
http://www.atragilatolaup.khulna.gov.bd/

From the information file of Atra Gilatala Union Council Secretary Suraya Parveen

Government National Portal

Unions of Phultala Upazila
Populated places in Khulna Division
Populated places in Khulna District